Kang Tan (born 22 September 1999) is a Korean handball player for Korea National Sport University and the Korean national team.

He represented Korea at the 2019 World Men's Handball Championship.

References

1999 births
Living people
Korean male handball players